Apodemia ares, the ares metalmark, is a species of metalmark in the butterfly family Riodinidae. It is found in North America.

References

Further reading

 

Riodininae
Articles created by Qbugbot
Butterflies described in 1882